The Connecticut Colony or Colony of Connecticut, originally known as the Connecticut River Colony or simply the River Colony, was an English colony in New England which later became Connecticut. It was organized on March 3, 1636 as a settlement for a Puritan congregation, and the English permanently gained control of the region in 1637 after struggles with the Dutch. The colony was later the scene of a bloody war between the colonists and Pequot Indians known as the Pequot War. Connecticut Colony played a significant role in the establishment of self-government in the New World with its refusal to surrender local authority to the Dominion of New England, an event known as the Charter Oak incident which occurred at Jeremy Adams' inn and tavern.

Two other English settlements in Connecticut were merged into the Colony of Connecticut: Saybrook Colony in 1644 and New Haven Colony in 1662.

Leaders 

Thomas Hooker delivered a sermon to his congregation on May 31, 1638, on the principles of government, and it influenced those who wrote the Fundamental Orders of Connecticut later that year. The Fundamental Orders may have been drafted by Roger Ludlow of Windsor, the only trained lawyer living in Connecticut in the 1630s; they were transcribed into the official record by secretary Thomas Welles. The Reverend John Davenport and merchant Theophilus Eaton led the founders of the New Haven Colony, which was absorbed into Connecticut Colony in the 1660s.

In the colony's early years, the governor could not serve consecutive terms, so the governorship rotated for 20 years between John Haynes and Edward Hopkins, both of whom were from Hartford. George Wyllys, Thomas Welles, and John Webster, also Hartford men, sat in the governor's chair for brief periods in the 1640s and 1650s.

John Winthrop the Younger of New London was the son of the founder of the Massachusetts Bay Colony, and he played an important role in consolidating separate settlements into a single colony on the Connecticut River. He also served as Governor of Connecticut from 1659 to 1675, and he was instrumental in obtaining the colony's 1662 charter which incorporated New Haven into Connecticut. His son Fitz-John Winthrop also governed the colony for 10 years starting in 1698.

Major John Mason was the military leader of the early colony. He was the commander in the Pequot War, a magistrate, and the founder of Windsor, Saybrook, and Norwich. He was also Deputy Governor under Winthrop. Roger Ludlow was an Oxford-educated lawyer and former Deputy Governor of the Massachusetts Bay Colony. He petitioned the General Court for rights to settle the area, and he led the March Commission in settling disputes over land rights. He is credited as drafting the Fundamental Orders of Connecticut (1650) in collaboration with Hooker, Winthrop, and others. He was also the first Deputy Governor of Connecticut.

William Leete of Guilford served as governor of New Haven Colony before its merger into Connecticut, and he also served as governor of Connecticut following Winthrop's death in 1675. He is the only man to serve as governor of both New Haven and Connecticut. Robert Treat of Milford served as governor of the colony, both before and after its inclusion in the Dominion of New England under Sir Edmund Andros. His father Richard Treat was one of the original patentees of the colony. Roger Wolcott was a weaver, statesman, and politician from Windsor, and he served as governor from 1751 to 1754. Oliver Wolcott was a signer of the Declaration of Independence and also of the Articles of Confederation, as a representative of Connecticut and the nineteenth governor. He was a major general for the Connecticut Militia in the Revolutionary War serving under George Washington.

Religion
The original colonies along the Connecticut River and in New Haven were established by separatist Puritans who were connected with the Massachusetts and Plymouth colonies. They held Calvinist religious beliefs similar to the English Puritans, but they maintained that their congregations needed to be separated from the English state church. They had immigrated to New England during the Great Migration. In the middle of the 18th century, the government restricted voting rights with a property qualification and a church membership requirement. Congregationalism was the established church in the colony by the time of the American Civil War.

Economic and social history 

The economy began with subsistence farming in the 17th century and developed with greater diversity and an increased focus on production for distant markets, especially the British colonies in the Caribbean. The American Revolution cut off imports from Britain and stimulated a manufacturing sector that made heavy use of the entrepreneurship and mechanical skills of the people. In the second half of the 18th century, difficulties arose from the shortage of good farmland, periodic money problems, and downward price pressures in the export market. In agriculture, there was a shift from grain to animal products. The colonial government attempted to promote various commodities as export items from time to time, such as hemp, potash, and lumber, in order to bolster its economy and improve its balance of trade with Great Britain.

Connecticut's domestic architecture included a wide variety of house forms. They generally reflected the dominant English heritage and architectural tradition.

See also 
 List of colonial governors of Connecticut
 History of the Connecticut Constitution
 Connecticut Western Reserve
 History of Springfield, Massachusetts

References 
Notes

Bibliography

 
 
 
 
 
 
 
 
 
 

Further reading
 Andrews, Charles M. The Colonial Period of American History: The Settlements, volume 2 (1936) pp 67–194, by leading scholar
  to 1664
 Burpee, Charles W. The story of Connecticut (4 vol 1939); detailed narrative in vol 1-2
 Clark, George Larkin. A History of Connecticut: Its People and Institutions (1914) 608 pp; based on solid scholarship online
 Federal Writers' Project. Connecticut: A Guide to its Roads, Lore, and People (1940) famous WPA guide to history and to all the towns online
 Fraser, Bruce. Land of Steady Habits: A Brief History of Connecticut (1988), 80 pp, from state historical society
 , vol. 1 to 1740s
 Jones, Mary Jeanne Anderson.  Congregational Commonwealth: Connecticut, 1636–1662 (1968)
 Roth, David M. and Freeman Meyer. From Revolution to Constitution: Connecticut, 1763–1818 (Series in Connecticut history) (1975) 111pp
 ; very old textbook; strongest on military history, and schools
 Taylor, Robert Joseph. Colonial Connecticut: A History (1979); standard scholarly history
  very old history; to 1764
 Van Dusen, Albert E. Connecticut A Fully Illustrated History of the State from the Seventeenth Century to the Present (1961) 470pp the standard survey to 1960, by a leading scholar
 Van Dusen, Albert E.  Puritans against the wilderness: Connecticut history to 1763 (Series in Connecticut history) 150pp (1975)
 Zeichner, Oscar. Connecticut's Years of Controversy, 1750–1776 (1949)

Specialized studies
 Buell, Richard, Jr. Dear Liberty: Connecticut's Mobilization for the Revolutionary War (1980), major scholarly study
 
 Collier, Christopher. Roger Sherman's Connecticut: Yankee Politics and the American Revolution (1971)
 Daniels, Bruce Colin. The Connecticut town: Growth and development, 1635–1790 (Wesleyan University Press, 1979)
 Daniels, Bruce C. "Democracy and Oligarchy in Connecticut Towns-General Assembly Office holding, 1701-1790" Social Science Quarterly (1975) 56#3 pp: 460-475.
 Fennelly, Catherine. Connecticut women in the Revolutionary era (Connecticut bicentennial series) (1975) 60pp
 Grant, Charles S. Democracy in the Connecticut Frontier Town of Kent (1970)
 Hooker, Roland Mather. The Colonial Trade of Connecticut (1936) online; 44pp
 
 Main, Jackson Turner. Connecticut Society in the Era of the American Revolution (pamphlet in the Connecticut bicentennial series) (1977)
 Pierson, George Wilson. History of Yale College (vol 1, 1952) scholarly history
 Selesky Harold E. War and Society in Colonial Connecticut (1990) 278 pp.
 Taylor, John M. The Witchcraft Delusion in Colonial Connecticut, 1647–1697 (1969) online
 , 700pp

Historiography
 Daniels, Bruce C. "Antiquarians and Professionals: The Historians of Colonial Connecticut," Connecticut History (1982), 23#1, pp 81–97.
 Meyer, Freeman W. "The Evolution of the Interpretation of Economic Life in Colonial Connecticut," Connecticut History (1985) 26#1 pp 33–43.

External links 

 Published colonial records

Archival collections
 Guide to the Connecticut Colony Land Deeds. Special Collections and Archives, The UC Irvine Libraries, Irvine, California.

Other
 Colonial Connecticut Records: The Public Records of the Colony of Connecticut, 1636–1776
 Colonial Connecticut Town Nomenclature
 Connecticut Constitutionalism, 1639–1789
 Timeline of Colonial Connecticut History

States and territories established in 1636
States and territories disestablished in 1776
1636 establishments in Connecticut
1776 disestablishments in the British Empire
 
Colonial settlements in North America
Colonial United States (British)
Dominion of New England
English colonization of the Americas
Former British colonies and protectorates in the Americas
Former English colonies
Thirteen Colonies
Christian states